Forsyth Park is a  park along the Fenway in Boston's Fenway–Kenmore neighborhood, in the United States. Part of the Emerald Necklace, the park features a statue of John Endecott.

References

External links

Fenway–Kenmore
Parks in Boston